The Saddlebunch Keys are a series of mangrove islands about  east of Key West, Florida.

The keys are scattered between Lower Sugarloaf Key and Shark Key.

U.S. 1 (or the Overseas Highway) crosses some of the Saddlebunches at mile markers 11.5—15.

Just east of Big Coppitt Key and Shark Key, and west of Sugarloaf Shores, is the small community of Bay Point that has fewer than 500 residents, a county park, and two stores. The community due west of Bay Point is Bluewater key, with fewer than 100 residents, they are connected by a bike path, that continues to Big Coppitt Key.

References

Islands of Monroe County, Florida
Unincorporated communities in Monroe County, Florida
Suburbs of Key West
Islands of the Florida Keys
Islands of Florida
Unincorporated communities in Florida